The River Greet is a small river in Nottinghamshire, England. Rising close to the village of Kirklington, the Greet flows in a southeasterly direction past Southwell and Rolleston to meet the River Trent at Fiskerton.

Hydrology
The catchment receives  of rainfall in an average year. Above Southwell, the underlying geology is mainly Sherwood and Mercia sandstone, with some  Mercia mudstone along the southern edge of the catchment. Below Southwell, the geology is predominantly Mercia mudstone. There is a layer of clay, sand and gravel alluvium overlaying this in the river channel.
The river is greatly affected by rainfall, raising levels and muddying the water.

Course
The river rises as a series of springs to the west of Kirklington, close to the  contour. It is joined by Cotton Mill Dyke and Edingley Beck, and to the east of Kirklington, turns to flow in a south-easterly direction. Halam Beck joins from the south, and there is a disused mill at Maythorne Farm. It was built as a cotton mill in 1795 by a hop merchant, to supply yarn to the framework knitting industry. The firm of Messrs. Bean and Johnson altered it in the early nineteenth century, after which silk and lace thread was produced. A small community was established around the mill, with cottages for some of the workers, of whom there were 70 in 1838, a general store, a public house and a mission hall. Willow for making baskets was grown in osier beds, and hops were also cultivated. The building was used as a billet for soldiers during the Second World War, by which time its industrial function had ceased. It has subsequently been converted into flats, with some of the outbuildings used as industrial workshops. There are two mill buildings, the north mill and the south mill, both of which are grade II listed structures. Below the mill the Robin Hood Way, a long distance footpath, follows the banks of the river, which forms the northern boundary of Southwell. There is a wildfowl centre on the north bank, and Caudwell flour Mill is on the south bank. It was built over the site of Burgage mill, a medieval building, and was bought by Charles Caudwell in 1851. He increased the capacity of the mill, which was subsequently damaged by fires in 1867, 1893 and 1917. Each time the mill was rebuilt, the equipment was upgraded. The Caudwell family were millers for four generations, after which Associated British Foods bought the mill. It closed in 1977, and was turned into flats in 1989.

After leaving the mill, the river crosses under the A612 road and flows through open countryside, to reach Upton Mill. It passes to the north of Southwell Racecourse, and then turns to the south, where Rolleston Mill is built over its course. This is a late eighteenth-century brick structure, with a basement, two storeys and a garret, which still contains some of the milling equipment. It is a grade II listed structure. The river continues under the Nottingham to Lincoln Line close to Rolleston railway station, to reach Fiskerton Mill, built on the site of a medieval mill owned by the monks of Thurgaton Priory. Just beyond the mill, it passes under a minor road and into the River Trent.

History
There was some sort of dispute in 1598, when the millers from Fiskerton, Rolleston and Upton went to Newark to collect corn for milling. They were detained, with their horses taken to the castle, and the corn was taken to "her majesty's mills", where it was ground and tolls were paid. Eventually the millers were set free. On another occasion, Rolleston's miller was detained by Edward Earl of Rutland, but was released when he promised not to collect any more corn from Newark. There seems to have been less of an issue when the inhabitants of Newark took their corn to the mills voluntarily.

The Willoughby family, who lived at Wollaton Hall ran a fleet of barges in the 1580s, and delivered coal to Southwell, which Caffyn has taken to mean that the river was navigable for the first  to enable this to happen.
Those who lived beside the river had a responsibility to keep it scoured, and on 13 July 1642 the residents of Rolleston, Southwell and Upton were indicted for not carrying out this duty.

Ecology
The upper reaches of the river contain fish such as brown trout (Salmo trutta), but although coarse fish species can be found lower down, the modifications made to the channel to assist its land-drainage function have resulted in the habitat suffering, with a result that fish numbers are low. The Environment Agency, who manage the river, have applied a "Hands-Off Flow" limit to the river, which specifies that if the flow drops below 2650 Megalitres per day (Mld) in the Trent, all abstraction of water must cease, in order to protect the environment. The volume of groundwater extracted from the catchment has fallen in recent years, with the result that water levels have risen a little.

Catches of Atlantic salmon (Salmo salar) have also been reported on the river.

The Environment Agency measure the water quality in the river systems of England. Each is given an overall ecological status, which may be one of five levels: high, good, moderate, poor and bad. There are several components that are used to determine this, including biological status, which looks at the quantity and varieties of invertebrates, angiosperms and fish. Chemical status, which compares the concentrations of various chemicals against known safe concentrations, is rated good or fail.

The water quality of the Greet and its tributaries was as follows in 2019.

Reasons for the water quality being less than good include sewage discharge into the river, physical modification of the river channel, drainage of water from the transport infrastructure, runoff from agricultural land, and the presence of the invasive North American crayfish. Like many rivers in the UK, the chemical status changed from good to fail in 2019, due to the presence of polybrominated diphenyl ethers (PBDE), perfluorooctane sulphonate (PFOS) and mercury compounds, none of which had previously been included in the assessment.

Points of interest

Bibliography

References

External links

Rivers of Nottinghamshire
1Greet
Tributaries of the River Trent